Herbert II (died 23 February 943), Count of Vermandois, Count of Meaux, and Count of Soissons. He was the first to exercise power over the territory that became the province of Champagne.

Life
Herbert was the son of Herbert I of Vermandois. He was apparently well aware of his descent from Charlemagne. Herbert inherited the domain of his father and in 907, added to it the Abbey of St. Medard, Soissons. He took the position of Lay abbot entitling him to the income of those estates. His marriage with a daughter of king Robert I of France brought him the County of Meaux.

In 922, when Seulf became Archbishop of Rheims, in an effort to appease Herbert II Seulf solemnly promised him he could nominate his successor. In 923, Count Herbert took the bold step of imprisoning King Charles III, who died still a captive in 929. Then, on the death of Seulf in 925, with the help of King Rudolph, he acquired for his second son Hugh (then five years old) the archbishopric of Rheims. Herbert took the additional step of sending emissaries to Rome to Pope John X to gain his approval, which that pope gave in 926. On his election young Hugh was sent to Auxerre to study.

In 926, on the death of Count Roger I of Laon. Herbert demanded this countship for Eudes, his eldest son. He took the town in defiance of King Rudolph leading to a clash between the two in 927. Using the threat of releasing King Charles III, whom he held captive, Herbert managed to hold the city for four more years. But after the death of Charles in 929, Rudolph again attacked Laon in 931 successfully defeating Herbert. The same year the king entered Rheims and defeated archbishop Hugh, the son of Herbert. Artaud became the new archbishop of Reims. Herbert II then lost, in three years, Vitry, Laon, Château-Thierry, and Soissons. The intervention of his ally, Henry the Fowler, allowed him to restore his domains (except Rheims and Laon) in exchange for his submission to King Rudolph.

Later Herbert allied with Hugh the Great and William Longsword, duke of Normandy against King Louis IV, who allocated the County of Laon to Roger II, the son of Roger I, in 941. Herbert and Hugh the Great took back Rheims and captured Artaud. Hugh, the son of Herbert, was restored as archbishop. Again the mediation of the German King Otto I in Visé, near Liège, in 942 allowed for the normalization of the situation.

Death and legacy
Herbert II died on 23 February 943 at Saint-Quentin, Aisne (the capital of the county of Vermandois) from natural causes. The story of him being hanged by king Louis IV (see fig. above) during a hunt is fictitious. His vast estates and territories were divided among his sons. Vermandois and Amiens went to the two elder sons while Robert and Herbert, the younger sons, were given the valuable holdings scattered throughout Champagne. On Robert's death his brother's son Herbert III inherited them all. Herbert III's only son Stephen died childless in 1019–20 thus ending the male line of Herbert II.

Family
Herbert married Adele, daughter of Robert I of France. Together they had the following children:

 Eudes of Vermandois, Count of Amiens and of Vienne, (–946)
 Adalbert I, Count of Vermandois (–987), married Gerberge of Lorraine
 Adela of Vermandois (910–960), married 934 Count Arnulf I of Flanders
 Herbert 'the Old' (–980), Count of Omois, married 951 Eadgifu of Wessex daughter of Edward the Elder King of England and widow of Charles III King of France.
 Robert of Vermandois, Count of Meaux and Châlons († 967)
 Luitgarde of Vermandois (–978), married 940 William I, Duke of Normandy; married secondly, Theobald I of Blois Their son was Odo I, Count of Blois.
 Hugh of Vermandois (920–962), Archbishop of Reims
 Guy I, Count of Soissons (d. 986).

Notes

References

Sources

|-

|-

Herbertien dynasty
Counts of Meaux
943 deaths
10th-century French people
Year of birth unknown